The fifth season of Pilipinas Got Talent is a talent show on ABS-CBN. The show premiered on January 23, 2016, replacing the temporary weekend block Kapamilya Weekend Specials, which temporarily filled the timeslot of second season of Your Face Sounds Familiar after it ended on December 13, 2015. It was originally aired at 9:30 PM, however, after Dance Kids ended, it was moved to an earlier timeslot of 7:30 PM to give way for I Love OPM.

The season ended on May 22, 2016, with interpretative dance duo Power Duo winning the season — the first season not won by a singing act.

Development
During the May 17, 2015, episode of ASAP, host Luis Manzano announced that the show will return for its fifth season, following the success of the four Filipino acts who competed in the grand finals of Asia's Got Talent. Two of those acts were formerly part of the show: singer Gerphil "Fame" Flores, who competed in the first season but lost the judges' vote in the fourth semifinal week, and shadow play group El Gamma Penumbra, who competed in the third season but placed fourth in the finals. Flores placed third while El Gamma won the inaugural season of the said regional franchise of Got Talent.

Host and judges
Billy Crawford and Luis Manzano are set to reprise their hosting duties although the judging panel will have significant changes. Ai-Ai delas Alas and Kris Aquino will not return to the judging panel; the former due to her return to GMA Network, while the latter cited health problems and give time to her sons. ABS-CBN board member Freddie M. Garcia confirmed his return as judge for the fifth consecutive season. On January 8, 2016, a teaser during FPJ's Ang Probinsyano revealed that actress Angel Locsin will be one of the judges. On January 9, 2016, a teaser during It's Showtime revealed that actor Robin Padilla will join Garcia and Locsin in the judging panel. The next day, January 10, a teaser during ASAP revealed that comedian Vice Ganda, who filled on delas Alas' slot last season as a guest judge, will be the fourth judge for this season.

Voting mechanics
Aside from the usual SMS voting, new to this season is the addition of an online voting method done via Google Philippines. By typing the keyword  in the search box, clickable photos of the contestants that had performed for that week will show up in the search results page; one Google account is entitled to one vote only.

Auditions

Pre-auditions
The pre-auditions for the fifth season took place in key cities in the Philippines. Pre-auditions were held in Manila, Batangas, Cebu, and Davao. But this season, the pre-auditions are judged by Pilipinas Got Talent staff and those who passed will make it to the live audition.

There were also mini-auditions in several cities and provinces in the Philippines including Antique, Aurora, Cabanatuan, Cagayan de Oro, Catarman, Catbalogan, Guimaras, Imus, Kalibo, Legazpi, Roxas, Tacloban, and Tarlac City. These mini-auditions are judged by Pilipinas Got Talent staff and those who passed will make it to the live auditions.

In addition, online auditions was put up where contestants can upload their own audition video and send it to the website of Pilipinas Got Talent.

Live auditions
The live auditions in front of the judges were held on January 12–14, 2016 at the Kia Theater in Araneta Center, Cubao, Quezon City (for the Manila auditions) and on January 21–23, 2016 at the Davao del Sur Coliseum in Digos (for the Visayas and Mindanao auditions). This fifth season, voting works on a majority-of-three basis (as there are now four judges). If an act receives three or more "yes" votes from the judges, they advance to the next round of the competition which is the judges cull.

Below are the acts that had received at least three Yes votes from the judges, and as well as those Golden acts:
{| class="wikitable collapsible collapsed" style="font-size:90%; line-height:17px;" width="100%"
! style="text-align: center" colspan="2" | Successful auditionees of Pilipinas Got Talent (season 5)
|-
|-valign="top"
| scope="row" rowspan="3" width="50%" | Auditionees from Luzon
 Histacity – dance group, Marikina
 The Poor Voice – male singing duo, Pasig
 Mercy Viola Daily, 66 – rapper, Baguio
 Geffrey delos Reyes, 29 – close-up magician, Pasig
 Splitters – dance group, Manila
 Rouge – all-female rock band, Quezon City
 Vernon De Vera – escape artist/illusionist, Marikina
 Power Duo – acrobats/dancers, Rizal
 X-Breaker - Hip-Hop dance group, Bacoor
 Rayner Dalde, 25 - Opera Singer, San Fabian, Pangasinan
 Pamilya Kwela - Comedy dance group, Rodriguez
 Back Ache Boys - Senior Boy band, Quezon City
 Louie Lorenzo, 25 - Male Aerialist, Quezon City
 Supper Goodie - Pep Squad duo, Calamba
 Moterozzo Twins - Singing/Beatbox Duo, Las Piñas
 Celine Manese, 19 - Pole Dancer, Parañaque
 Micah Cate, 26 - Singer, Manila
 Rolando Parico, 53 - Beatles Parody performer, Santa Mesa, Manila
 Amazing Pyra, 21 - Fire Dancer, Antipolo, Rizal
 Dino Splendid Acrobats, 20-37 - All-Male Acrobat Group, Santo Tomas (Batangas)
 Jeremiah Velasco, 33 - Singer, Kawit
 Mark Mestiola, 21 - Basketball performer, Muñoz
 Allyza Imatong, 8 - Pole Dancer, Rodriguez 
 Shadow Ace, 19 - Shadow Play Performer, Calatagan, Batangas
 Liquid Concepts - Flair Bartending Couple, Quezon City
 The Chosen Ones, 9-12 - Kiddie Band, Imus
 Ody Santo Domingo, 31 - Close-up Magician, Santa Mesa, Manila
 Derf Cabael, 33 - Singer, Bacoor
 Odette Cagandahan, 32 - Blacklight artist, Paete, Laguna
 Vidad Sisters - Singing Duo, Binangonan, Rizal
 Power Impact Dancers - Dance Group, Manila
 Percival Denolo, 43 - mud shadow artist, Valenzuala City
 Francis Anne Virtudazo, 36 - Kudiman singer, Quezon City
 Next Level Octomix - Jump Rope Dancers, Caloocan
 Voice Male - Male singing group, Quezon City
 Rodrigo Brothers - Sibling Drummers, Balayan, Batangas
 Dos Fuerte Bailarines - Dancesport Duo, Tuguegarao
 P.W.R. Music - Singer/Rapper couple, Pasig
 Urban Crew - Hip-hop dance group, Las Piñas
 The Elite - Tribal Dance Group, Muntinlupa
 Troy Perez, 27 - Mentalist, Quezon City
 BSJ Drum Troops - All-Male Drum group, Las Piñas
 Elektro Kids, Hovertrax performers, Quezon City
 Likhain Dance Crew, Modern Folk dance group, Tondo
 Lezboys - Singing group, Antipolo
 Noe Bersola, 35 - Acrobat, Noveleta, Cavite
 Mark Dune Basmayor, 27 - Contortionist, Cabuyao
 Pizza Masters - Dough Throwing performers, Manila
 Reynaldo Mape Jr., 27 - Rubik's Cube solver, Valenzuela
 Cabuyao Acrobats - Acrobat group, Cabuyao
 Ronel Baladad, 21 - Hulahoop performer, Nueva Vizcaya
 Tito's Duo - Acrobat Duo, Quezon City
 Raymond Capino, 20 - Flow blacklight performer, Lemery, Batangas
 Malvar Acrobats - Acrobat group, Batangas
 Team Rappa - Dance group, Tondo, Manila
 Samuel Villacorta,5 - Kid Genius, Lipa
 Nikki Gadiane,18 - Singer, Cavinti, Laguna 
 Sandugo Dance Troupe - Modern Folk dance group, Oriental Mindoro
 Music Foundation - Marching band group, Dasmariñas
 Bad Hair Day - All-Female band, Quezon City
 Rado Delfin, 27 - Shadow play performer, Quezon City
 FA Rock - Band, Binangonan, Rizal
 Rhey Otic, 30 - Singer, Manila
 Jezarine Linco, 19 - Singer, Valenzuala
 Voices - Singing group, Quezon City
 Eugene Rubio, 37 - acrobat, Talisay, Batangas
 Melchizedek Bicija, 19 - Vocal impersonator, Calamba
 Happy Twins, 18 - Twin Acrobats, Taguig

| width="50%" | Auditionees from Visayas The Simpson Tribe, 2-43 - Acrobat group, Roxas, Capiz
 FA Flow Circle, 17-23 - LED TRON dance group, Cebu City
 Daniel Bautista, 42 - Yoyoy Villame impersonator, Sagbayan, Bohol
 The Raes, 17-43 - Mother-Daughters band, Cebu City
 M.A.T.T.I., 12 - Martial arts exhibition group, Bacolod
 Mastermind, 18-26 - Dance group, Borongan
 Deniel Sarmiento, 15 - Dancer, Boracay
 Angel Fire, 18-21 - Belly dancers, Cebu City
 Dona Aguire, 52 - Singer, Kalibo
 Kurt Philip Espiritu, 14 - Singer, Bacolod
 Bailes de Luces - Light Dancers, Bacolod
 Big One - Musician Group, Negros Occidental
 Gerome Siguan, 22 - Fire pole dancer, Guiuan, Eastern Samar
 Don Juan - Dance group, Cebu City
 Alicia Bohol Musika Kawayan - Bamboo musicians, Bohol
 Rey Mark Mijaran, 25 - Comb & paper musician, Jaro, Leyte
 Jade Riccio, 26 - Singer, Puerto Princesa
 DBND Dancers - Kid Ballroom dancers, Iloilo City
 Rodolfo Mercado, 76 - Leaf-harp musician, Bohol
 Roma Villarete, 36 - magician, Boracay
 Bacolod City Electric Masskara - Light dancers, Bacolod 
|-
| scope="row" width="50%" | Auditionees from Mindanao Gensan Contortionists, 18-25 - All-male contortionist group, General Santos
 Jovanny Sumabal, 24 - Freestyle Rapper, Davao City
 DM-X Comvalenoz, 18-24 - Hip-hop dance group, Nabunturan, Compostela Valley
 Gian Bacalso, 22 - Freestyle drummer, Davao City
 D'Gemini, 22 - Female Hip-hop dance duo, Panabo
 Queen Beats, 14-15 - Female Beatbox duo, Sarangani
 Luna Brothers - Dance duo, Davao City
 Sto. Tomas Bulilit Generation - Kid acrobats, Santo Tomas (Davao del Norte)
 Legendary Fire Artists - Fire dancers, Davao City
 Koro Teatrico - Comical Choir, Digos
 Brian Sescon, 6 - Kid Motocross racer, Davao City
 Mabini Senior Scouts - Drill Performers, Davao City
 Twin Brothers - Dance/acrobatic duo, Davao City
 Um Tagum Castreal Duo - Dance duo, Davao City
 Father & Song - Sing/Rap duo, Iligan
 Crossover Family - Hip-hop dance group, Davao City
 Nique Mancha, 21 - Pole dancer, Davao City
 Binibining Beats - Female beatboxer, Zamboanga City
 Gensen Parkour - Parkour group, General Santos
 UA Mindanao - Motocross performers, Kidapawan
|-
| scope="row" width="50%" | Auditionees from the overseas Joey Alberto, 20 - Dancer, California, United States
|-
| scope="row" colspan="2" | NOTE:' Please be guided that the list above is incomplete.|-
|}

Golden buzzer
Another new addition to this season is the golden buzzer. During the live auditions, there is a golden buzzer placed in the center of the judges' table. The buzzer is pressed by a judge on an act to send directly to the live semi-finals. Each judge is allowed to press the buzzer only once during the whole duration of the auditions.

Padilla was the first judge to use the golden buzzer, pressing it for acrobatic duo, Power Duo. Locsin was the next to press for flair bartending couple Liquid Concepts. Then Vice Ganda was the third judge to press for collegiate Hip-Hop dance troupe, Power Impact Dancers, with Garcia coming in last, doing so for hat tricker/contortionist Mark Dune Basmayor. All four were found during the Manila auditions, hence the lack of calls for the use of the Golden Buzzer during the Davao auditions.

Judges Cull
There are 132 acts who made it to the Judges Cull. Out of 132 acts, only 36 will move forward to the Live Semi-Finals. There are four golden buzzer acts who instantly made it to the Semi-Finals and 27 acts were made it through the unanimous decisions of the judges. However, there are 16 acts in the waiting list who performed for the remaining five slots in the semi-finals and complete the Top 36.

Unanimous decision
These acts were chosen based on unanimous decisions by the judges to move forward to the Live Semi-Finals. Twenty-seven of these acts advanced to the live shows.

 Standby Acts 
The following acts who performed again for the remaining five slots.

Unknown decision
Several acts were unable to compete in the Judges Cull for personal reasons, or were not seen during the airing of the episodes. These acts were therefore automatically assumed as eliminated from the competition.

Top 36 results summary
Color key

Semifinals
The Semifinals began on April 9, 2016, in Newport Performing Arts Theater, Resorts World Manila in Pasay, Metro Manila, where five of the six semi-final rounds took place. Each week, performances from four out of six acts took place on Saturday nights, while during Sunday nights, the two remaining acts performed and the results were announced on the same night.

Semifinals summary

Week 1 (April 9 & 10)
 Guest performers: PGT Season 1-4 winners Jovit Baldivino, Marcelito Pomoy, Maasinhon Trio & Roel Manlangit – "Posible"/"Tayo'y mga Pinoy"/"Noypi"

Week 2 (April 16 & 17)
 Guest performers: SI.CO.GU, Tito Cris Castro, Marvin Arquero from PGT Season 4

Week 3 (April 23 & 24)
 Guest performers: Bela Padilla with D' Intensity Breakers from PGT Season 4.

This particular semi-finals week was held outdoors at the MX Messiah Fairgrounds in Taytay, Rizal due to the size of stage required for UA Mindanao's performance and the dangerous nature of the fire acts. Also, the show temporarily vacated the Newport Performing Arts Theater to accommodate the finals nights of another competition program I Love OPM. Additionally, the Sunday telecast was moved from the usual early evening slot to past 9:45 pm due to the airing of the Luzon leg of the 2016 PiliPinas Debates.

Week 4 (April 30 & May 1)
 Guest performers: Jed Madela with PGT Season 1 semi-finalist and Asia's Got Talent season 1 finalist Gerphil Flores

The live shows returned indoors to the Newport Performing Arts Theater for this round. This round saw the first judges' vote impasse, forcing a return to the public's vote results for the second grand finalist from this round.

Week 5 (May 7 & 8)
 Guest performers: Erik Santos, KZ Tandingan, and Yeng Constantino (promotion of We Love OPM) with Season 4's Frankendal Fabroa

Robin chose not to reveal his vote as the Dino Splendid Acrobats had already accumulated three votes.

Week 6 (May 14 & 15)
 Guests: #Hashtags (from It's Showtime'')

Grand Finals 
The live shows of the grand finale premiered at the Mall of Asia Arena over a span of two nights, the performance night (May 21) and the results night (May 22). For the first time in Pilipinas Got Talent, the winner was based from the public votes (50%) and the scores of the judges (50%).

UA Mindanao and the Amazing Pyra each held the outdoor parts of their performances a few days in advance at the MX Messiah Fairgrounds in Taytay, Rizal. Robin and Vice Ganda were personally present during those performances.
Color key

References

Pilipinas Got Talent
2016 Philippine television seasons